Stefan Hansson (born December 6, 1957) is a Swedish football manager who holds a UEFA Pro Licence.
He has worked alongside many different nationals managers and coaches including Stuart Baxter and Greg Reoch from England, enabling him to exchange many different techniques and acquired a good understanding of diversity and culture in the game.
He had a great deal of success through his career winning 8 League Titles and 1 Cup with different clubs in different countries as Sweden, Norway, Denmark, Seychelles, Vietnam and Myanmar. As a player, he played for several clubs in Sweden, Australia and the United States. Late in his career he also acted as player manager before becoming a full-time manager. During 2018 he will manage the Swedish third-tier side Älvsborg FF.

References

1957 births
Swedish expatriate sportspeople in Denmark
Swedish expatriate sportspeople in Myanmar
Swedish expatriate sportspeople in Indonesia
Swedish football managers
Expatriate football managers in Denmark
Expatriate football managers in Myanmar
Expatriate football managers in Indonesia
Indonesia Super League managers
Living people
Skovlunde IF managers
Zeyashwemye F.C. managers
Mitra Kukar managers
Swedish footballers
Landskrona BoIS players
Swedish expatriate footballers
Expatriate soccer players in Australia
Expatriate soccer players in the United States
South Melbourne FC players
Expatriate football managers in Vietnam
People from Svalöv Municipality
Association footballers not categorized by position
Ballerup-Skovlunde Fodbold managers
Footballers from Skåne County
Sarpsborg 08 FF non-playing staff